Poecile is a genus of birds in the tit family Paridae. It contains 15 species, which are scattered across North America, Europe and Asia; the North American species are the chickadees. In the past, most authorities retained Poecile as a subgenus within the genus Parus, but treatment as a distinct genus, initiated by the American Ornithologists Union, is now widely accepted. This is supported by mtDNA cytochrome b sequence analysis.

The genus Poecile was erected by the German naturalist Johann Jakob Kaup in 1829. The type species was subsequently designated as the marsh tit (Poecile palustris) by English zoologist George Robert Gray in 1842. The name Poecile is from Ancient Greek poikilos "colourful". A related word poikilidos denoted an unidentified small bird.  It has traditionally been treated as feminine (giving name endings such as cincta); however, this was not specified by the original genus author Johann Jakob Kaup, and under the ICZN the genus name must therefore be treated by default as masculine, giving name endings such as cinctus.

Species
The genus includes the following fifteen species:

References

 
Bird genera